Thomas Weikert (born Hadamar 24 March 1953) is a German sports official. He is current President of the International Table Tennis Federation (ITTF) and was elected to office on 31 May 2017. Formerly the Deputy President, Thomas Weikert became President in 2014 when Adham Sharara, who had held the office since 1999, assumed the role of Chair and Honorary President of the International Table Tennis Federation. As ITTF President, he is also the ex officio member and President of the Governing Board of ITTF Foundation.

References 

Living people
1953 births
Presidents of the International Table Tennis Federation
German sports executives and administrators
People from Hadamar
Sportspeople from Giessen (region)